Perfect World is a British comedy television series that was first shown on BBC Two in the UK from 25 February 2000 to 25 June 2001. It is set around the life of Bob Slay (played by Paul Kaye), an obnoxious, lazy and amoral phony marketing executive for a leading toiletries company. Yet Bob has a swish office and an attractive girlfriend, and is well regarded by his manager.

The television series was written by Mark Grant (who would later go on to write Star) and Mark Chapman who was a co-writer for the second series and provided additional material for the first series. Mark Chapman also directed the first series and produced both series with Nick Wood directing the second. The show's other producer was Lucy Robinson (who produced the first Dennis Pennis instalment and played the mayoress in The Thin Blue Line) and it had executive producers Danielle Lux (All About Me) and Charles Brand (The Comic Strip Presents...).

Cast 

Paul Kaye as Bob Slay
Derren Litten as Vaughan Rogers
Nina Wadia as Margaret (Maggie) Stone
Michael Cochrane as Terrence Bentley (Marketing Director)
Tasha de Vasconcelos as Lauren
Ekaterina Parfionova as Anna Molchanov
Dariel Pertwee as Briony
Hannah Storey as Julia

Episodes

Series 1 (2000)

Series 2 (2001)

Video and DVD releases 

Perfect World series one was released on VHS in 2000, and rated 18 probably due to Paul Kaye saying the word "fuck" in the episode 'Love'. The video has been discontinued but a Region 2 DVD box set containing both series one and two was due for release on 26 January 2009 by 2entertain, the joint venture by the BBC Worldwide and Woolworths Group. BBC Worldwide own 60% of 2entertain, while Woolworths Group own 40%. However, the release was affected by the collapse of Woolworths in the UK and legal arguments and challenges by the BBC Worldwide over the ownership of the rights over the recordings owned by 2entertain following the demise of Woolworths Group. The legal dispute centres on whether a licensing agreement between BBC Worldwide and 2entertain lapsed when Woolworths Group went into administration.

Quotes and reviews 
Paul Kaye said in an interview regarding the series: "I've never really worked in an office but it was the way I imagined you'd keep sane - I mean an office is sort of like an extended playground, isn't it? So the guy does absolutely no work and the only way he can relieve the tedium is by behaving despicably and I think the whole office would actually be sad if he left because it would suddenly be all very mundane. I mean I'm sure that's the case in a lot of real offices - it's like on reality-TV shows, everyone quite likes the bad guy in the Big Brother house, really."

Tasche de Vasconcelos who plays Lauren in the first series said: "It's a great show, I'm just so proud to have been able to do it. It's brilliantly written". She later went on to describe Paul as "a wonderful actor and co-partner he was so professional".

This is a review of the first episode of series one: "The stylish opening to this new office-centered, six-part situation comedy introduces Bob Slay, the ultimate marketing man. Paul Kaye (well known as spoof interviewer Dennis Pennis), stars as a slick and selfish operator with a saccharine tongue who occasionally justifies his behaviour in asides to the camera. His only real area of vulnerability is his parentage - he was abandoned as a baby. That makes him particularly nervous when he has to meet his gorgeous girlfriend Lauren's parents for the first time. The plotting is quite convoluted in this distinctly adults-only opener, but it has its moments. The best of them involve the marketing director, played by Michael Cochrane as a sex-mad monster who steals all the best lines. Even he confesses to being a little over-eager with Lauren's mother, played by Jan Harvey."

References

External links 
 
 DVD Rights owner 2entertain https://web.archive.org/web/20080509161030/http://www.2entertain.co.uk/
 https://web.archive.org/web/20070628212848/http://www.bbc.co.uk/comedy/guide/articles/p/perfectworld_66602780.shtml (NB: Site no longer available)

2000 British television series debuts
2001 British television series endings
2000s British sitcoms
BBC television sitcoms
Television series by Endemol
Television series by Tiger Aspect Productions
English-language television shows
Television series produced at Pinewood Studios